"Carnival" is a pop song by Swedish band the Cardigans. It was released in 1995 as the first single from their second album Life. It gave the group their first appearance on the UK Singles Chart, reaching number 72 in June 1995. After their next single, a re-issue of "Sick & Tired", reached the top 40, "Carnival" was re-pressed and reached a peak of number 35. This release also peaked at number 44 in the Netherlands, becoming the band's first single to chart there.

"Carnival" was the first released material by the Cardigans on which Nina Persson received a writing credit, on this occasion alongside bassist Magnus Svenningsson whom she would later supersede as the group's primary lyricist. The song concerns the narrator's unrequited love for a boy, and mentions a "carnival" (the description actually appears to refer to a funfair) which the narrator would like to attend with the boy but does not go because he never responds to her. The song's verses include the sound of what appears to be a hammond organ.

The single's B sides were a cover of Ozzy Osbourne's "Mr Crowley", one of several Osbourne and Black Sabbath cover versions released by the group; and "Emmerdale", an instrumental which shared its name with their previous album, but did not appear on it.

Critical reception
James Masterton for Dotmusic wrote, "It's in a similar vein to their last hit; light, almost fluffy jazz-pop that sounds gorgeous but is unlikely to bring them a major hit just yet."

Music video
The accompanying music video of "Carnival" was directed by Swedish-based director Matt Broadley.

Track listing
International CD single (1995)
"Carnival" - 3:20
"Mr Crowley" - 2:35
"Emmerdale" - 2:25

Charts

Certifications

References

1995 singles
The Cardigans songs
Songs written by Peter Svensson
Songs written by Nina Persson
Music videos directed by Matt Broadley
1995 songs
Songs written by Magnus Sveningsson